James Black (born August 31, 1975) is a Canadian guitarist, singer, songwriter and musician based in Toronto, Ontario. Black is best known for his role as the lead guitarist in the band Finger Eleven since 1990, and co-founder, guitarist, and singer of Blackie Jackett Jr.

Black is also known for occasionally stepping in for Evanescence’s guitarist Troy McLawhorn. Additionally, he appears on "Gone" by Justin Nozuka, RZA, Kobra Khan, and himself, released on November 14, 2011.

Career

Finger Eleven
James Black is the lead guitarist, backup singer and a founding member of rock band Finger 11 – formerly known as Rainbow Butt Monkeys. As a band, they have released 6 studio albums, 1 live album, 2 EPs and 22 singles. An update on January 29, 2015 indicated that preparations were in the final stages of production and promised new details and artwork in the near future.

The band released their seventh album "Five Crooked Lines" July 31, 2015, and released the lead single "Wolves and Doors" to Canadian radio. They've recently set upon the Fall of the Hammer Tour in support of the release.

Blackie Jackett Jr

Blackie Jackett Jr is the side project of James Black with Finger Eleven bandmate Rick Jackett. They are joined by Jimmy Reid, Sandra Dee, Scott Brewer, Tino Zolfo and Neil Angus Macintosh. The alternative country band has released 1 full album and 2 singles since 2011.

Solo career

Working under his own name, James Black's solo career is his most recent brainchild. To date, he has released one album entitled Moon Boot Cocoon.

Moon Boot Cocoon

Black's first solo album debuted May 27, 2014. The experimental rock album was produced by Tino Zolfo. On Moon Boot Cocoon, Black plays all of the instruments except for the drums. It was primarily released digitally, however, through a Pledge Music campaign he released a number of Vinyl and CD to individual contributors.

On March 14, 2015, 102.1 The Edge premiered the official video Color Blind on their website.

Discography

Solo
2014: Moon Boot Cocoon

Finger Eleven
1995: Letters from Chutney
1998: Tip
2000: The Greyest of Blue Skies
2003: Finger Eleven
2007: Them vs. You vs. Me (Deluxe Edition)
2007: Them vs. You vs. Me
2007: Them vs. You vs. Me (Bonus Cuts) [EP]
2007: Connect Sets (Live) [EP]
2008: iTunes Originals: Finger Eleven
2008: Falling On [EP]
2010: Life Turns Electric
2010: iTunes Live from Montreal
2015 Five Crooked Lines

Blackie Jackett Jr
2011: Whisky and Tears
2013: Honky Tonk Santa (Single)
2014: I Got Stoned and I Missed It (Single)

Awards and nominations

References and notes

Living people
Canadian rock guitarists
Canadian male guitarists
1975 births
21st-century Canadian guitarists
21st-century Canadian male musicians